The 2015 World Judo Championships were held in Astana, Kazakhstan, from 24–30 August 2015. The competition was held at the Alau Ice Palace.

Schedule
All times are local (UTC+6).

Medal summary

Medal table

Men's events

Women's events

Prize money
The sums written are per medalist, bringing the total prizes awarded to 200,000$ for the individual events and 100,000$ for the team events.

References

External links
 
 Official website

 
World Judo Championships
World Championships
World Championships
Judo World Championships
Judo World Championships
Judo World Championships
World 2015
August 2015 sports events in Asia